George and the Blue Moon is a 2016 children's book written by Lucy and Stephen Hawking with Christophe Galfard. The book was preceded by George's Secret Key to the Universe in 2007, George's Cosmic Treasure Hunt in 2009, George and the Big Bang in 2011 and George and the Unbreakable Code in 2014.

See also 
 A Brief History of Time by Stephen Hawking
 Black Holes and Baby Universes and Other Essays
 George's Secret Key to the Universe
 George's Cosmic Treasure Hunt
 George and the Big Bang
 George and the Unbreakable Code

References

2016 children's books
2016 science fiction novels
British children's novels
Children's science fiction novels
British science fiction novels
Popular science books
Books by Stephen Hawking
Doubleday (publisher) books